Sangbar (also Romanized as Sang Bor) is a village in Takab Rural District, in the Central District of Dargaz County, Razavi Khorasan Province, Iran. At the 2006 census, its population was 95, in 28 families.

References 

Populated places in Dargaz County